Stillborn is the third studio album by Florida death metal band Malevolent Creation. It was released in 1993 on Roadrunner Records. Larry Hawke from the band HatePlow originally did drums on the album but Phil wanted the drum tracks re-done, Alex Marquez ended up playing on the album instead due to Larry getting a DUI and ending up in jail for it. Roadrunner also wanted Brett to re-do his vocals but the band couldn't get him to and Roadrunner ended up dropping the band from their label, they ended up getting licensing deals for the subsequent labels they dealt with and to this day they still own rights to all their post-Roadrunner albums.

Track listing

Personnel
Malevolent Creation
 Bret Hoffmann - vocals
 Jon Rubin - lead guitar
 Phil Fasciana - lead guitar, rhythm guitar, producer
 Alex Marquez - drums
 Jason Blachowicz - bass, logo

Guest musicians
 Dave Smadbeck - keyboards, samples

Production
 Mark Pinske - executive producer, mixing, engineering, recording
 Eddy Schreyer - mastering

Artwork
 Dan Seagrave - cover art
 Jeff Juszkiewicz - logo
 SMAY - art direction

References

Malevolent Creation albums
1993 albums
Albums with cover art by Dan Seagrave
Roadrunner Records albums